Yongning is a town under the administration of Zhidan County, Shaanxi, China. , it has 14 villages under its administration.

See also
List of township-level divisions of Shaanxi

References

Township-level divisions of Shaanxi
Zhidan County
Towns in China